Michelle Arvizu is a television and film actress, having a recurring role on the show Kevin Hill (2004).

Born on a May 24 in Mexico to an Italian mother and a Mexican father, she originally studied architecture with the idea of staying as close as possible to the stage. She took her first professional role as Dorothy in The Wizard of Oz.

Michelle graduated from The Randolph Academy for the Performing Arts in August 2002.

In February 2004, she became a Canadian Permanent Resident and in September 2009 she became a Canadian Citizen.

References

External links
 
 Michelle Arvizu - Official page

Living people
Canadian television actresses
21st-century Mexican actresses
Mexican emigrants to Canada
Mexican people of Basque descent
Mexican people of Italian descent
Naturalized citizens of Canada
Canadian people of Basque descent
Canadian people of Italian descent
Canadian film actresses
Randolph College for the Performing Arts alumni
Year of birth missing (living people)